Robert Griffier (c. 1675 in England – after 1727 in Amsterdam), was an 18th-century landscape painter from London who was active in Amsterdam.

Biography
According to Houbraken, Griffier was born in England in 1688 as the son of Dutch painter Jan Griffier, and learned painting from his father. 
He did not accompany his family when they moved to the Netherlands and so wasn't on board when they had their shipwreck in 1695, but was in Ireland. Before 1700 he moved to the Netherlands and after his father returned to England, he stayed in Amsterdam, painting Italianate landscapes in the manner of Herman Saftleven.

According to the RKD Houbraken, Griffier was born on 7 October 1688, but this is the birthdate of his brother Jan (John), who may have shared his studio.
Some of his works are co-signed by Carel Breydel.  From these his birth year is deduced as c. 1675.  He became an Amsterdam citizen in October 1716. 
He went to London after his father's death in 1718. Jan van Gool wrote that he met Robert in London in 1727. Van Gool claimed he was a follower of Philips Wouwerman and Van de Velde who could paint "Rhine landscapes" and had on occasion painted figures in Ruisdael paintings.

References

External links
Robert Griffier on Artnet

1670s births
18th-century deaths
Year of birth uncertain
Year of death unknown
18th-century Dutch painters
18th-century Dutch male artists
Dutch male painters
Painters from London